Cadlinella ornatissima is a species of sea slug or dorid nudibranch, a marine gastropod mollusk in the family Chromodorididae.

Distribution 
This species is widespread in the central Indo-Pacific region  and also occurs off Australia (Queensland).

Description

Ecology

References

Chromodorididae
Gastropods described in 1928